Olivian Laurențiu Surugiu (born 28 February 1990) is a Romanian professional footballer who plays as a midfielder.

Honours
Hermannstadt
Cupa României: Runner-up 2017–18

References

External links
 
 

1990 births
Living people
Sportspeople from Craiova
Romanian footballers
Association football midfielders
Liga I players
Liga II players
FC U Craiova 1948 players
CS Turnu Severin players
FC Petrolul Ploiești players
SCM Râmnicu Vâlcea players
FC UTA Arad players
CS Universitatea Craiova players
CS Pandurii Târgu Jiu players
CS Gaz Metan Mediaș players
FC Hermannstadt players